The South Coast Metropole, established in 1993, is a loose union of local authorities on England's south coast, designed to promote their common interests.  The association currently consists of the councils of:

Poole (Poole Borough Council)
Bournemouth (Bournemouth Borough Council)
Southampton (Southampton City Council)
Portsmouth (Portsmouth City Council)
Isle of Wight (Isle of Wight Council)

References

External links 
King Sturge: South Coast Metrolpole 2008

Local government in England